Vitor Hugo Franchescoli de Souza (born 20 May 1991), known as Vitor Hugo, is a Brazilian footballer who plays as a central defender for Turkish club Trabzonspor.

Club career
Hugo scored his first goal for Fiorentina in a Serie A match against Benevento on 11 March 2018, the only goal of the game, dedicating it to his club's recently deceased captain Davide Astori by saluting a T-shirt bearing Astori's image.

On 5 October 2020, Hugo signed a 4-year contract with Turkish club Trabzonspor.

International career
He was called up for the Brazil national team in January 2017 for a friendly against Colombia, but remained an unused substitute.

Career statistics

Honours
Palmeiras
 Campeonato Brasileiro Série A: 2016
 Copa do Brasil: 2015

Trabzonspor
 Süper Lig: 2021–22
 Turkish Super Cup: 2020, 2022
Individual
Süper Lig Defender of the Year: 2020–21

References

External links

1991 births
Living people
Footballers from São Paulo (state)
Brazilian footballers
Brazilian expatriate footballers
Association football defenders
Campeonato Brasileiro Série A players
Campeonato Brasileiro Série B players
Serie A players
Süper Lig players
Esporte Clube Santo André players
Sport Club do Recife players
Ituano FC players
Ceará Sporting Club players
América Futebol Clube (MG) players
Sociedade Esportiva Palmeiras players
ACF Fiorentina players
Trabzonspor footballers
Expatriate footballers in Italy
Expatriate footballers in Turkey
Brazilian expatriate sportspeople in Italy
Brazilian expatriate sportspeople in Turkey